Bongo may refer to:

Entertainment
 Bongo (Australian TV series), on air from August to November 1960
 Bongo Comics, a comic book publishing company
 Bongo (Dragon Ball) or Krillin, a character in Dragon Ball media
 Bongo (Indian TV series), an Indian television drama for children 2004
 Bongo, a character in the Matt Groening comic strip Life in Hell
 Bongo, a dog who played drums in the ITV children's series Animal Kwackers
 Bongo Submarine, a fictional vehicle in the film Star Wars: Episode I – The Phantom Menace
 Bongo, the cartoon ape bouncer from the 1988 film, Who Framed Roger Rabbit
 "Little Bear Bongo", a 1930 short story for children by Sinclair Lewis
 Bongo, a segment of the 1947 Disney film Fun and Fancy Free, adapted from the Lewis story

Music
 Bongo drum, a percussion instrument made up of two small drums attached to each other
 The Bongos, an America pop music band
 Music Man Bongo, a model of bass guitar

Places
 Bongo Country, the name of several places in Africa
 Bongo District, a district in the Upper East Region of Ghana
 Bongo, Ghana, a town, capital of Bongo District
 Bongo (Ghana parliament constituency), in Bongo District
 Bongo Gewog, a village in Chukha District, Bhutan
 Bongo, Ivory Coast, a sub-prefecture and commune
 , Sulu Archipelago, Philippines
 Bongo Massif, a mountain range in north-eastern Central African Republic
 Bôngo, alternative name for Bengal (eastern India and Bangladesh)
 Mbongo, Angola, a town in Huambo Province, Angola, often called Bongo
 El Bongo, Panama

Transportation
 Bongo (canoe), typically found in the Hispanic Caribbean regions
 Kia Bongo, an automobile
 Mazda Bongo, a van
 Gin Bongo, a South Korean paraglider design
 LNER Thompson Class B1, known as 'Bongos' or 'Antelope'

People
 Bongo people (Gabon), a forest people
 Bongo people (South Sudan), an ethnic group in Sudan

Names
 Bongo (name), a list of people with the surname
 Bongo Herman (born 1941), Jamaican percussionist and singer Herman Davis, active in the early 1960s
 Bongo Joe Coleman (1923–1999), American street musician
 Sketchy Bongo (born 1989), South African record producer, DJ, and songwriter
 Steady Bongo (born 1966), Sierra Leonean musician and record producer
 Bongo (Numan Athletics), video game character

Other uses
 Bongo (antelope), a species of forest antelope from Africa
 Cavanillesia platanifolia, a tree also known as bongo
 Bongo language, the language of the Bongo people of Sudan
 Bongo (software), an open source mail and calendar project
 DK Bongos, a video game controller
 Bongo Jeans/Bongo Apparel, a clothing brand that was acquired by the Iconix Brand Group in 1998
 Operation Bongo II, 1964 Oklahoma City sonic boom tests

See also
 Bongo Bongo Land, a derogatory reference to Third World countries, particularly those in Africa
 Bongo-Bongo (linguistics), used as a name for an imaginary language
 Bonga (disambiguation)
 Bungo (disambiguation)
 Mbongo (disambiguation)
 Um Bongo, a fruit drink marketed at children
 Bong Go, a Filipino politician